Goodenia pterigosperma is a species of flowering plant in the family Goodeniaceae and is endemic to south-coastal areas in the south-west of Western Australia. It is an erect to sprawling, glabrous perennial herb or shrub with linear to lance-shaped leaves mostly at the base of the plant, and racemes of dark blue flowers.

Description
The edges of the leaves are rolled inwards with a few teeth.

Taxonomy and naming
Goodenia pterigosperma was first formally described in 1810 by Robert Brown in his Prodromus Florae Novae Hollandiae et Insulae Van Diemen. The specific epithet (pterigosperma) means "wing-seeded".

Distribution and habitat
This goodenia grows in sandy soil in heath and woodland, occurring near the coast in the south-west of Western Australia, between Jerramungup and Israelite Bay.

References

pterigosperma
Eudicots of Western Australia
Plants described in 1810
Taxa named by Robert Brown (botanist, born 1773)
Endemic flora of Australia